William Walter McDonald (July 4, 1844 – June 20, 1929) was a politician from Northwest Territories, Canada who served as a member of the House of Commons of Canada from 1892 to 1896.

Background 
McDonald was born in Pigeon Hill, Quebec. He was elected to the House of Commons of Canada in a by-election on November 21, 1892. He was defeated by James Moffat Douglas from the Liberal Party of Canada in the 1896 Canadian federal election after serving just one partial term in office.

References
 

1844 births
1929 deaths
Members of the House of Commons of Canada from the Northwest Territories